Agelasta densemarmorata is a species of beetle in the family Cerambycidae. It was described by Stephan von Breuning in 1968. It is known from Laos.

References

densemarmorata
Beetles described in 1968